The Lianhua Dam is a concrete-face rock-fill dam on the Mudan River in Linkou County of Heilongjiang Province, China. The dam withholds a large  capacity reservoir and supports a 550 MW power station. Construction on the dam began in November 1992 and its first 137.5 MW Francis turbine-generator was operational in December 1996. Two more generators were commissioned on 12 December 1997 and the remaining generator was commissioned on 28 September 1998. It is the first large modern water conservancy project in Heilongjiang. The dam's reservoir displaced 40,000 people and will serve as the lower reservoir for the Huanggou Pumped Storage Power Station when it is complete.

See also

List of dams and reservoirs in China

References

Dams in China
Concrete-face rock-fill dams
Dams completed in 1996
Energy infrastructure completed in 1998
1998 establishments in China
Hydroelectric power stations in Heilongjiang